Grace Episcopal Church is a historic Episcopal church located at Waverly in Tioga County, New York.  It is a Gothic Revival style wood-frame structure, three bays wide and six bays deep, and resting on a brick foundation with cement veneer. The building was built in 1854 and features a steeply pitched gable roof, an arched double door entry, and lancet windows.  A wooden belfry is perched on the peak of the gable.

It was listed on the National Register of Historic Places in 2000.

References

External links
Grace Church of the Chemung Valley Cluster, Episcopal Diocese of Central New York

Churches on the National Register of Historic Places in New York (state)
Episcopal church buildings in New York (state)
Gothic Revival church buildings in New York (state)
Churches completed in 1854
19th-century Episcopal church buildings
Churches in Tioga County, New York
National Register of Historic Places in Tioga County, New York
1854 establishments in New York (state)